Igor Sikorski (born 5 July 1990) is a German-born Polish male paralympic alpine skier. He made his Paralympic debut during the 2018 Winter Paralympics and claimed Poland's only medal at the 2018 Winter Paralympics after clinching a bronze medal in the men's giant slalom event.

In 2022, he won the silver medal in the men's giant slalom sitting alpine skiing event at the 2021 World Para Snow Sports Championships held in Lillehammer, Norway.

He represented Poland at the 2022 Winter Paralympics held in Beijing, China.

References

External links 
 

1990 births
Living people
Polish male alpine skiers
Alpine skiers at the 2018 Winter Paralympics
Alpine skiers at the 2022 Winter Paralympics
Paralympic alpine skiers of Poland
Paralympic bronze medalists for Poland
Medalists at the 2018 Winter Paralympics
Sportspeople from Göttingen
Paralympic medalists in alpine skiing